Ostrzyca may refer to:
Ostrzyca (hill), an extinct volcano in southwestern Poland
Ostrzyca, Lublin Voivodeship, a village in eastern Poland
Ostrzyca, West Pomeranian Voivodeship, a village in northwestern Poland